USS Rogers Blood (APD-115), ex-DE-605, was a United States Navy  in commission from 1945 to 1946.

Namesake
Rogers Blood was born at Manchester, New Hampshire on 29 January 1922. He attended Manchester Central High School in Manchester and was awarded the Rotary Cup in his senior year as the most outstanding student in his class. Rogers then entered Dartmouth College in Hanover, New Hampshire, as a member of the Class of 1944. He left Dartmouth and enlisted in the United States Marine Corps Reserve on 3 January 1942. He accepted a commission as second lieutenant on 13 January 1943, and was promoted to first lieutenant on 1 February 1944. He served at the Marine Barracks at Marine Corps Base Quantico, Virginia, and at Camp Lejeune, North Carolina. From 21 May 1943, he served in the World War II Pacific Theater of Operations.

On 18 February 1944 Blood was serving in the 22nd Marine Regiment when it landed on Engebi Island as part of the invasion of Eniwetok Atoll. While leading his platoon in a charge across open terrain in the face of severe Japanese machine-gun, mortar, and rifle fire to dislodge the heavily entrenched Japanese, he was killed in action. He was posthumously awarded the Silver Star and the Purple Heart.

Construction and commissioning
Originally, Rogers Blood was planned to be the Rudderow-class destroyer escort USS Rogers Blood (DE-605), and was laid down as such on 12 April 1945 by Bethlehem-Hingham Shipyard at Hingham, Massachusetts. She was launched on 2 June 1945, sponsored by Mrs. Robert M. Blood. Rogers Blood was re-classified as a Crosley-class fast transport and redesignated USS Rogers Blood (APD-115) on 17 July 1945. She was commissioned on 22 August 1945.

Service history

On 8 September 1945, Rogers Blood departed Boston, Massachusetts, for Guantanamo Bay, Cuba, where she completed a six-week shakedown cruise, and was then ordered to Chester, Pennsylvania, to participate with the submarine USS Sabalo (SS-302) in Navy Day ceremonies which brought approximately 40,000 persons as visitors. She was in the Norfolk Navy Yard at Portsmouth, Virginia, from 31 October 1945 to 15 November 1945, then moved to Jacksonville, Florida, where she reported to the Atlantic Reserve Fleet. On 18 November 1945 she arrived at the St. Johns River in Florida for lay-up.

Decommissioning and disposal

Rogers Blood was decommissioned and placed in reserve on  19 March 1946 and berthed at Green Cove Springs, Florida, where she remained until stricken from the Navy List on 1 June 1960. She was sold on 14 December 1961 to the Southern Scrap Material Company of Louisiana for scrapping.

References

NavSource Online: Amphibious Photo Archive USS Rogers Blood (APD-115)

 

Crosley-class high speed transports
Ships built in Hingham, Massachusetts
1945 ships